Lambodar Baliar   is an Indian politician. He was elected to the Lok Sabha, the lower house of the Parliament of India from Bastar, Madhya Pradesh as an  Independent.

References

External links
 Official biographical sketch on the Parliament of India website

Independent politicians in India
Lok Sabha members from Madhya Pradesh
India MPs 1971–1977
Living people
Year of birth missing (living people)
Place of birth missing (living people)